Diana Iris Bar-Oz (born 2 July 1984) is an American-born Israeli footballer who plays as a defensive midfielder. She plays domestic football for Pali Blues in the W-League and has represented Israel at the international level.

Early life and education 
Diana Iris Redman (or Dayana Raidman/Radman) was born in New York, to a Jewish family. She attended New Hyde Park Memorial High School in New York. She was offered a full athletic scholarship by Rider University; however, she transferred to Queens College after her freshman year. Intending only to stay at Queens a semester before transferring to a more prestigious institution, she changed her mind after joining the soccer program headed by former Israeli international Roby Young.

While playing for Queens College in New York she was a National Collegiate Athletic Association (NCAA) nominee for Woman of the Year, and received Queens College Knight Athlete of the Year.

Redman graduated from Queens College in May 2009 with a Masters of Fine Arts with a specialty in Poetry and Creative Writing, a BA in Sociology with a concentration in social research and statistics, and a BA in English while receiving the Zolot Award for Literary Promise. She graduated from Tel Aviv University with her second Master's degree concentrated in Trauma and Crisis, from the Bob Shapell School of Social Work. Before committing to a professional soccer career, she earned All American honors in the Heptathlon and ran track and field at Rider University.

Playing career

Club 
While still in college, Redman played for the Long Island Rough Riders in the American W-League.

In 2006, she moved to Israel and joined Maccabi Holon in the Israeli Women's First League. During her time with Maccabi Holon, she made six UEFA Women's Champions League appearances. Redman has been featured on Israel Sports Radio and Haaretz for both her academic and athletic achievements.

In 2013, Redman returned to the W-League, playing for the Pali Blues. In 2014, Redman trialed with Houston Dynamo, but was injured during the pre-season. In 2015, Redman signed with Spanish club Santa Teresa CD.

International 
As of November 2013, she has played nine matches for Israel, most recently in October 2013.

Life outside football 
While playing in Israel, Redman balanced her professional soccer playing career while working as a social worker, developing sports education programs for young girls in Israel and around the world, and working as a freelance photographer.

References

External links
 Official website
 
 Queens College player profile 

1984 births
Living people
Citizens of Israel through Law of Return
American people of Israeli descent
Israeli people of American-Jewish descent
People from New Hyde Park, New York
Sportspeople from Nassau County, New York
Soccer players from New York (state)
American women's soccer players
Israeli women's footballers
Women's association football midfielders
Queens Knights athletes
Queens College, City University of New York alumni
Tel Aviv University alumni
Long Island Rough Riders (USL W League) players
Maccabi Holon F.C. (women) players
Pali Blues players
Santa Teresa CD players
Israel women's international footballers
Israeli expatriate women's footballers
American expatriate women's soccer players
Israeli expatriate sportspeople in Spain
American expatriate sportspeople in Spain
Expatriate women's footballers in Spain
United Women's Soccer players